Denis-Louis Destors (October 27, 1816 – 26 May 1882) was a French architect.

1816 births
1882 deaths
19th-century French architects